Marc Chadourne (23 May 1895 – 30 January 1975) was a 20th-century French writer, winner of the prix Femina in 1930.

Biography 
Marc Chadourne was writer 's brother. He studied at the Sorbonne. Engaged at 19 in 1914 at the beginning of the First World War, he joined the field artillery in Lorraine and on the front of Artois. He became a pupil-pilot in 1916 and ended the war in the aviation on the eastern front.

Back in Paris in 1919 and marked by war - he decided then for a wandering life in search of discoveries - Marc Chadourne was received first in the entry competition to the Ministère des Colonies. He held positions in the colonial administration in Oceania and then in Cameroon. A translator of novels by Joseph Conrad, he also lent his pen to many newspapers. In 1927 he published Vasco, a novel set in French Polynesia, in memory of his brother. In 1930, he obtained the prix Femina for Cécile de la Folie. When the Second World War broke out, he took refuge in the United States and became a professor at Scripps College in Claremont in California then in the University of Utah in Salt Lake City. He met the Mormons and wrote a biography of Joseph Smith.

In 1950, the Académie française rewarded him with its Grand prix de littérature for all of his work.

Work 
1927: Vasco, Plon, Prix Paul Flat of the Acadéie française, reprinted in 1994 at éditions la Table ronde
1930: Cécile de la Folie, Plon — prix Femina
1931: Chine, Plon
1932: L'U.R.S.S. sans passion, Plon (illustrated edition published by Mornay in 1932)
1933: Absence, Plon
1934: Anahuac ou l'Indien sans ses plumes, Plon
1935: Extrême-Occident (Tour de la Terre *), Plon
1935: Extrême-Orient (Tour de la Terre **), Plon
1937: Dieu créa d'abord Lilith, Plon
1947: La Clé perdue, Plon
1949: Gladys ou les Artifices, Plon
1950: Quand Dieu se fit Américain, éditions Arthème-Fayard
1955: Le Mal de Colleen, Plon
1958: Restif de la Bretonne, Plon
1961: Isabelle ou le Journal amoureux d'Espagne, éditions Jean-Jacques Pauvert
1967: Eblis ou l'Enfer de William Beckford, éditions Jean-Jacques Pauvert

References

External links 
 Marc Chadourne on Babelio
 Marc Chadourne (1895-1975), l’absent on CAIRN
 Extensive biography
Marc Chadourne on the site of the Académie française

20th-century French non-fiction writers
20th-century French male writers
Prix Femina winners
People from Brive-la-Gaillarde
1895 births
1975 deaths